The Blackstone Boulevard–Cole Avenue–Grotto Avenue Historic District is a predominantly residential historic district roughly bounded by Blackstone Boulevard, Cole Avenue, Grotto Avenue, President and Rochambeau Avenues on the east side of Providence, Rhode Island. It encompasses one of the last areas of the city be developed residentially. The architecture in the area is heterogeneous, with Colonial and Georgian Revival styles predominating. The area was developed after the city built Blackstone Boulevard with the intention of developing the area into a streetcar suburb.

The district was listed on the National Register of Historic Places in 2009.

See also

National Register of Historic Places listings in Providence, Rhode Island

References

Victorian architecture in Rhode Island
Historic districts in Providence County, Rhode Island
Geography of Providence, Rhode Island
Historic districts on the National Register of Historic Places in Rhode Island
National Register of Historic Places in Providence, Rhode Island